Gabriela Tsvetanova (born 11 April 1991) is a Bulgarian female volleyball player. She is part of the Bulgaria women's national volleyball team. At slub level she plays as opposite for VK Maritsa Plovdiv (2017-2018).

Sporting achievements

Clubs

National championships
 2007/2008  Bulgarian Championship, with CSKA Sofia
 2009/2010  Bulgarian Championship, with CSKA Sofia
 2010/2011  Bulgarian Championship, with CSKA Sofia
 2014/2015  3rd place in Hellenc Championship, with Pannaxiacos A.O. Naxos
 2015/2016  Hellenc Championship, with Olympiacos Piraeus

National trophies
 2007/2008  Bulgarian Cup, with CSKA Sofia
 2008/2009  Bulgarian Cup Runners up, with CSKA Sofia
 2009/2010  Bulgarian Cup, with CSKA Sofia
 2010/2011  Bulgarian Cup, with CSKA Sofia
 2015/2016  Hellenic Cup, with Olympiacos Piraeus
 2016/2017  Bulgarian Cup, with VK Maritsa Plovdiv

Individuals
 2015-16 Best Opposite in Hellenc Championship, with Pannaxiacos A.O. Naxos

References

External links
 Gabriela Tsvetanova at the International Volleyball Federation
 
  
  

1991 births
Living people
Bulgarian women's volleyball players
Olympiacos Women's Volleyball players
Place of birth missing (living people)
Opposite hitters
Expatriate volleyball players in Romania
Expatriate volleyball players in Greece
Bulgarian expatriate sportspeople in Romania
Bulgarian expatriates in Greece